The 2003 World Indoor Target Archery Championships were held in Nîmes, France from 5 - 9 March 2003.

Medal summary (Men's individual)

Medal summary (Women's individual)

Medal summary (Men's team)

Medal summary (Women's team)

References

World Indoor
World Indoor Archery Championships
International archery competitions hosted by France
World Indoor Archery Championships
World Indoor Archery Championships